Far Niente Winery is a winery based in Oakville, California, located within the Oakville AVA appellation. It was founded in 1885 by John Benson, but abandoned during Prohibition in 1919. The property was restored by Gil Nickel in 1979. The winery now produces wines from Cabernet Sauvignon and Chardonnay.

The name of the winery comes from the Italian phrase dolce far niente, meaning "the sweetness of doing nothing". It has been listed on the National Register of Historic Places.

References 

Wineries in Napa Valley
1885 establishments in California
Buildings and structures in Napa County, California